Douglas John McIntyre (born November 11, 1957) is the former host of McIntyre In The Morning on KABC 790 Los Angeles. He retired after 22 years in broadcasting on December 14, 2018. McIntyre is a long-time columnist for the Southern California News Group which includes the Los Angeles Daily News.

Known for his active involvement in local politics and his passion for jazz and the Great American Songbook,  McIntyre's background includes work as television writer-producer with credits including Married... with Children, WKRP in Cincinnati, Full House, Mike Hammer, and the critically acclaimed PBS series, Liberty's Kids, which earned McIntyre a Humanitas Prize nomination. With his wife, actress Penny Peyser, McIntyre wrote, produced, and directed the feature-length documentary film, Trying to Get Good: The Jazz Odyssey of Jack Sheldon, released in 2008. Doug is executive producer of Penny Peyser's 2016 feature documentary, Stillpoint.
 
McIntyre is a frequent master of ceremonies, having performed on stage with icons Robert Redford, Betty White, Ron Howard, John Cleese, and Steve Martin as part of the California Distinguished Speakers Series. He also hosted Tony Bennett in conversation at the Landmark Theater in West Los Angeles and was master of ceremonies for the 50th and 51st Cinema Audio Society Awards at the Biltmore Hotel, as well as a three-time host of the annual Los Angeles Political Roast.

 Career 
 Radio 
After four years hosting KABC's overnight show Red Eye Radio, McIntyre inherited the morning drive position when veteran host Ken Minyard retired in October 2004. On September 24, 2009, McIntyre announced that he was leaving effective the end of the day's broadcast.

Beginning May 8, 2011, he hosted Doug McIntyre's Red Eye Radio which was broadcast on flagship station 770 WABC in New York, as well as 100 other stations across the country. On December 9, 2011, it was announced that he would be returning to KABC, Los Angeles, to host a new morning drive show, Mcintyre In The Morning, effective January 3, 2012. McIntyre was teamed with former KFI afternoon news anchor Terri-Rae Elmer. Elmer exited the program in December 2016. McIntyre was joined by Leeann Tweeden in February 2017. In November of that year, McIntyre and Tweeden broke the Senator Al Franken story that resulted, ultimately, in Franken's resignation from the United States Senate. 
In December 2018, McIntyre announced that he would be leaving KABC. His final program was December 14.

Television
McIntyre is a frequent television guest. He has appeared on Lou Dobbs Tonight, Bill Maher's Politically Incorrect, Planet Green’s Supper Club with Tom Bergeron, and HBO's Real Time with Bill Maher. McIntyre appeared on The History Channel, as well as Fox News Channel's The O'Reilly Factor and Hannity & Colmes. He hosted his own segment on CNBC's The Dennis Miller Show. McIntyre also wrote at least two episodes of The New WKRP in Cincinnati.

 Newspaper 
Doug writes a weekly column for the Los Angeles Daily News, which appears every Sunday. He has also written for the Los Angeles Times, as well as The Daily Beast, American History Illustrated, and LA Jazz Scene. An amateur historian, McIntyre is an expert on the Wright brothers.

 Film 
McIntyre and his wife, actress Penny Peyser, wrote, produced, and directed Trying to Get Good: The Jazz Odyssey of Jack Sheldon (2008), a feature-length documentary film of Jack Sheldon. It won Jury Prizes at the Newport Beach Film Festival and at the Kansas City Film Makers Jubilee, and won Audience Prizes at Newport Beach and the Indianapolis International Film Festival. It also won an audience prize at the prestigious Nashville International Film Festival.

 Personal life 
McIntyre grew up in Great Neck, New York and is a graduate of Stonehill College. He is the stepfather of two sons, by wife Peyser, one of whom was a helicopter pilot in the U.S. Army.

Awards and recognition
Doug McIntyre won the Best Columnist award in 2011 from the California Association of Newspaper Publishers for his work in the Los Angeles Daily News. He was also awarded Outstanding Alumnus by his alma mater, Stonehill College, in 2010. For the PBS series Liberty's Kids, Doug earned a Humanitas Prize nomination for excellence in television writing. McIntyre has also been ranked one of the Top 40 radio hosts in the nation by the radio industry journal, Talkers Magazine''. Year after year, McIntyre has been selected by his peers as one of the "most popular" and "most admired hosts" in the annual LARadio.com poll.

References

External links

Official website

1957 births
Living people
American television writers
American male television writers
Writers from Glen Cove, New York
Radio personalities from Los Angeles
Stonehill College alumni
Television producers from California
Screenwriters from New York (state)
Television producers from New York (state)
Screenwriters from California